Qeshlaq-e Hajj Hoseyn (also Romanized as Qeshlāq-e Ḩājj Ḩoseyn) is a village in Qeshlaq Rural District, Abish Ahmad District, Kaleybar County, East Azerbaijan Province, Iran. At the 2006 census, its population was 32, in 9 families.

References 

Populated places in Kaleybar County